The Charles Berry Bridge, in Lorain, Ohio along U.S. Route 6 (US 6), is the second-largest bascule bridge in the world. It was dedicated on Veterans Day in 1988. The bridge had been built in the late 1930s and in use for roughly 48 years before extensive rehabilitation was finished and the bridge was officially renamed in honor of Lorain native Charles J. Berry, a Marine who was awarded the Medal of Honor for his actions during a minor grenade battle on Iwo Jima.

During its construction, the Erie Avenue Bridge (as it was formerly called) was the largest bascule bridge in the world. and is now considered to be the second-largest.

The Ohio Department of Transportation (ODOT) agreed in 1989 to cover funding for the bridge which saves Lorain county nearly half a million US dollars per year. The Charles Berry Bridge is one of only three bridges in Ohio that the ODOT will currently fund.

The Charles Berry Bridge is one of the primary methods of transportation between the east and west of Lorain across Black River along with the Lofton Henderson Memorial Bridge which is also named after a native of Lorain who was awarded the Navy Cross for his heroism at the historic Battle of Midway.

See also

 The Ashtabula lift bridge, another bascule bridge in Ohio

References

External links

Official website

Bascule bridges in the United States
Buildings and structures in Lorain, Ohio
Bridges completed in 1988
Transportation in Lorain County, Ohio
Road bridges in Ohio
U.S. Route 6
Bridges of the United States Numbered Highway System